Screen space directional occlusion (SSDO) is a computer graphics technique enhancing screen space ambient occlusion (SSAO) by taking direction into account to sample the ambient light (both the light coming directly at an object, as well as the light reflected off of the object directly behind it), to better approximate global illumination.

References

Shading
Computer graphics
3D computer graphics
Global illumination algorithms